Dave McDonald (born April 6, 1960) is a Canadian former professional ice hockey player.

Amateur career
He played junior A hockey for the Portage Terriers and St. James Canadians, Major Junior hockey for the Brandon Wheat Kings, and college hockey for the University of Minnesota-Duluth.  He competed in the 1979 Memorial Cup.

Professional career
He played 187 games, including playoffs, for the Binghamton Whalers of the American Hockey League.  He also played 13 games for the Saginaw Gears of the International Hockey League.  He also played in one game for the Mohawk Valley Stars of the Atlantic Coast Hockey League.

References

External links

1960 births
Living people
Binghamton Whalers players
Brandon Wheat Kings players
Canadian ice hockey left wingers
Hartford Whalers draft picks
Minnesota Duluth Bulldogs men's ice hockey players
Mohawk Valley Stars players
Saginaw Gears players